Nahéma Ricci, also known as Nahéma Ricci-Sahabi, (born  1997) is a Canadian actress.

Ricci was born in Montreal to immigrant parents, and is of French and Tunisian ancestry.

She appeared in the 2017 film Ailleurs. Ricci said she won the title role of the 2019 film Antigone after participating in a long series of auditions held to fill all the film's roles. In La Presse,  praised Ricci's acting in Antigone. She was named one of the  "rising stars" at the 2019 Toronto International Film Festival, and won the Canadian Screen Award for Best Actress at the 8th Canadian Screen Awards. She also won the Prix Iris for Revelation of the Year at the 22nd Quebec Cinema Awards.

In 2020 she starred in the short film Girls Shouldn't Walk Alone at Night (Les filles ne marchent pas seules la nuit).

References

External links

Actresses from Montreal
Best Actress Genie and Canadian Screen Award winners
Canadian film actresses
Canadian people of French descent
Canadian people of Tunisian descent
Living people
Year of birth uncertain
Year of birth missing (living people)